Love with Privileges is a 1989 Soviet film drama directed by Vladimir Kuchinsky.

Plot
USSR, the end of the 80s. Former Deputy Chairman of the Council of Ministers Kozhemyakin comes to rest in Yalta. To meet him at the station is asked Irina, who works as a van driver. An accidental resort acquaintance suddenly turned into something more. Neither the age difference nor the social situation did not become a hindrance. Irina agrees to become Kozhemyakin's wife and moves to Moscow.

In Moscow, taking advantage of her husband's acquaintances, Irina inquires about the circumstances of her father’s arrest, who was repressed after the war and shot in 1952 (the family was sent to Vorkuta, the mother soon died there too). And it turns out that in Stalin's times her new husband was one of those who signed the letter of collective condemnation, after which her father was shot.

Cast
 Lyubov Polishchuk as Irina Nikolaeva
 Vyacheslav Tikhonov as Konstantin Gavrilovich Kozhemyakin
 Oleg Tabakov as  Nikolai Petrovich, KGB General
 Lidiya Fedoseyeva-Shukshina as Maria Spiridonovna
 Pyotr Shcherbakov as Mossovet vice-chairman
 Aleksandr Feklistov as Dr. Lev Petrovich
 Yuri Sarantsev as  Dr. Kondakov
 Aleksandr Baluev as Kozhemyakin Jr.
 Galina Stakhanova as old-timer
 Alika Smekhova as waitress
 Fyodor Odinokov as General, Kozhemyakin's friend

TV version 
The duration of the TV version entitled City Details, released in 1990, is 157 minutes.

References

External links 
  

1989 films
Soviet drama films
1989 drama films
Studio Ekran films
Mosfilm films
Films set in Crimea